The American Institute of Physics (AIP) promotes science and the profession of physics, publishes physics journals, and produces publications for scientific and engineering societies. The AIP is made up of various member societies. Its corporate headquarters are at the American Center for Physics in College Park, Maryland, but the institute also has offices in Melville, New York, and Beijing.

Historical overview
The AIP was founded in 1931 as a response to lack of funding for the sciences during the Great Depression. It formally incorporated in 1932 consisting of five original "member societies", and a total of four thousand members. A new set of member societies was added beginning in the mid-1960s. As soon as the AIP was established it began publishing scientific journals.

Member societies

Affiliated societies

List of publications

The AIP has a subsidiary called AIP Publishing (wholly owned non-profit) dedicated to scholarly publishing by the AIP and its member societies, as well on behalf of other partners.

AIP Style
Just as the American Chemical Society has its own style called ACS Style, AIP has its own citation style called AIP Style which is commonly used in physics.

See also
 Institute of Physics
 PACS
 Science Writing Award
 SPIE
 Joan Warnow-Blewett

References

External links
AIP website
Member societies of the AIP
AIP journals
AIP Scitation website, which host academic articles of journals published by societies members of AIP, and by societies who decided to host their articles on the platform
American Center for Physics website

 
Scientific organizations established in 1931
Physics societies
Academic organizations based in the United States
Scientific supraorganizations
1931 establishments in the United States